Joseph Patrick Escalante (born January 30, 1963) is an American television writer, film and television director, musician, radio host, and former television executive. He is known professionally as the bassist and songwriter for the punk rock band The Vandals, and creator and episodic director of the paranormal travel series Monsters Across America on Fox Nation.

Early life
Escalante was born the youngest of 7 children in Long Beach, California to a Mexican father and Irish mother and grew up in Rossmoor, California, an unincorporated area of Orange County. His father was a pioneer in the electric sign industry, founding Superior Signs, Intl. and designing several iconic atomic age flashing signs that have dotted prominent American city skylines.  His mother worked as a bowling alley clerk in Seal Beach, California.

Education
Escalante received his Bachelor degree from UCLA studying Viking civilization under Professor Jesse Byock and his Juris Doctor from Loyola Law School. He graduated from Los Alamitos High School in the class of 1981 and was elected to the Los Alamitos High Hall of Fame in 2014. Escalante studied at University of Iceland at Reykjavik Graduate Program in 1985.

Career

Career with The Vandals
In 1980, at age 18, Escalante joined the punk rock band The Vandals, becoming their first permanent drummer, and would remain the sole constant member throughout the rest of their career. The Vandals released their debut EP Peace thru Vandalism in 1982 through Epitaph Records. In 1984 Escalante and the other band members appeared in the Roger Corman film Suburbia, directed by Penelope Spheeris and released their first album When in Rome Do as the Vandals. In 1987 they appeared in another Spheeris film, Dudes. By 1989 Escalante had moved from the drums into the bass guitar position. Fluctuations in the lineup continued until 1989, when the current iteration of singer Dave Quackenbush, guitarist Warren Fitzgerald, and drummer Josh Freese released the album Fear of a Punk Planet, establishing themselves amongst an emerging new crop of southern California punk rock bands. This lineup would remain consistent throughout the rest of the band's career and would release numerous albums, tour extensively, and form their own record label.

Television career
After graduating law school in 1992, Escalante worked as an executive in the department of business affairs for CBS. During his time with the network, he negotiated actor, writer, and director deals on programs like Everybody Loves Raymond, Rescue 911, and Walker, Texas Ranger, for which he co-produced the theme song “Eyes of a Ranger” after convincing Chuck Norris to sing the theme song to his own series.

After four years, he left CBS to consult with the United Paramount Network,  tour with The Vandals,  and operate his record label Kung Fu Records where he also produced concert films and low-budget features. In 1999, one of the first streaming TV series, Fear of A Punk Planet, was ordered by the Digital Entertainment Network (DEN), and was later released as a comic book in 2017.

In 2015, Escalante was hired by the Discovery I.D./Discovery Channel to produce scripted true crime TV series True Nightmares where he wrote scripts and served as the production re-writer for the 1st and 2nd seasons. In 2017 he began working as a writer for History Channel's sci-fi documentary series Ancient Aliens. As a freelance writer, Escalante has penned scripts for such shows as Oxygen Channel's Buried in the Back Yard, Travel Channel's In Search of Monsters, and History's Curse of Oak Island.

In 2018, Escalante wrote the pilot script for the reboot of the 1960s hit TV series Hogan's Heroes for original creator and 2 time best picture winner Albert S. Ruddy, which as of 2022 is still in development with Albert S. Ruddy Productions. This time, the series is set in Guantanamo Bay.

Escalante sold the paranormal show Monsters Across America starring Kacie McDonnell to Fox Nation in 2020.

Nitro and Kung Fu Records
In 1995 the Vandals signed a record deal with Nitro Records owned by The Offspring's Dexter Holland and released the album Live Fast, Diarrhea. The album brought increased attention to the band and Escalante toured with them internationally. He directed their music video for "I Have a Date," and would continue to direct the band's videos throughout the rest of their career. The band released 3 more albums on Nitro over the next 5 years, with Escalante participating on all of them.

In 1996 Escalante and Warren Fitzgerald started the record label Kung Fu Records, initially to release a debut album by the Assorted Jelly Beans. Escalante named the label after his study of Kung Fu San Soo. Eventually, Escalante left CBS Television and took over operations of the label, signing acts such as The Ataris, Ozma, Tsunami Bomb, Kenneth Keith Kallenbach, Longmont Potion Castle, and The Vandals. Kung Fu's most successful release was Buddha, the debut album by the band Blink-182. Escalante ran the U.S. and European operations for 20 years, then sold the label to Cleopatra Records, who continue to maintain it as a separate imprint.

Directing and producing 
Using his experience in the television industry, Escalante formed Kung Fu Films in 2000 as an offshoot of the record label, and produced and starred in the independent film That Darn Punk and the early streaming series Fear of a Punk Planet. He also continued to produce and direct music videos for The Vandals and for other acts on the Kung Fu label. In 2002 he launched the DVD live concert series The Show Must Go Off!  for which produced and/or directed over 20 long form concert films. In 2005, he directed the independent film, shot on film, Cake Boy featuring Scott Aukerman, Warren Fitzgerald, Bob Odenkirk, Patton Oswalt, Brian Posehn,  and Cherry 2000's Pamela Gidley.

Sweet and Tender Hooligans
In 2004 Escalante joined the Sweet and Tender Hooligans, a Smiths/Morrissey tribute band composed primarily of Latino members. In 2006 he traveled with them to the United Kingdom to celebrate the 20th anniversary of the Smiths album The Queen Is Dead.

Radio hosting
In 2005, Escalante was hired to host a weekly radio program originally "Barely Legal Radio" on the Los Angeles/Orange County radio station Indie 103.1 FM, where he dispensed entertainment and legal advice to aspiring musicians. In May 2006, he became the host of the station's morning drive-time program The Last of the Famous International Morning Shows, replacing Mighty Mighty Bosstones singer Dicky Barrett.

Escalante's morning show included daily appearances by film director David Lynch, who served as weatherman, and actor Timothy Olyphant, who served as a sports commentator. The show also featured a weekly wine tasting and education hour called "Wino Wednesday", and hosted a number of celebrity guests including Crispin Glover, Christina Ricci, Pat Buchanan, Will Ferrell, Maynard James Keenan, Werner Herzog, Phil Donahue, Kristen Stewart, Harry Shearer, Dennis Hopper, and Andy Dick. The show was endorsed by companies and products such as iPod, iTunes, and AT&T. Indie pulled the plug on the show in November 2008. Two months later, the entire station went off the air and switched to Spanish ranchero music.

Joe's call-in entertainment law show stayed on the web version on Indie 1031 until it finally landed on Clear Channel/Iheart Media's KEIB AM 1150 in 2009, where it can still be heard today live on Sundays at 5pm to 7pm, PST. In April 2019, the name was changed to "Joe Escalante, Live from Hollywood."

Personal life

Marriage
Escalante married in 1996. His wife, Sandra Escalante, appeared briefly in the 2005 film Cake Boy which he directed (as a member of the counseling group). The two now live together in Seal Beach, California.

Family 
Escalante's brother Greg Escalante founded Juxtapoz magazine and the Gregorio Escalante Gallery. Escalante's step brother Mike Fries is CEO and Vice Chairman of Liberty Global. Escalante's brother in law is actor/composer Paul Williams.

Religious and political views
Escalante teaches Catechism at St. Peter Chanel Catholic Church in Hawaiian Gardens where he is a daily communicant. He has no stated political party affiliation.

From 2008 to 2012, Escalante worked as a volunteer temporary judge for the Los Angeles superior court, and later placed himself on the ballot for a paid position in a non-partisan race. Street artist Shepard Fairey created a campaign poster for Escalante, his first candidate poster since his iconic representation of President Barack Obama. Escalante raised $15,000 for his campaign with the posters and received 18.41% of the vote. His opponent spent a record $450,000 to defeat him.

Discography

Studio albums
1984: When in Rome Do as the Vandals
1989: Slippery When Ill
1990: Fear of a Punk Planet
1995: Live Fast, Diarrhea
1996: The Quickening
1996: Oi to the World!
1998: Hitler Bad, Vandals Good
2000: Look What I Almost Stepped In...
2002: Internet Dating Superstuds
2004: Hollywood Potato Chip

Filmography

Acting

I Escalante's scenes in Punk Rock Holocaust were deleted from the final version of the film.

Direction and production

References

External links
 Barely Legal Radio
 Professional website
 

1963 births
20th-century American bass guitarists
20th-century American male musicians
21st-century American bass guitarists
21st-century American male musicians
Living people
American punk rock bass guitarists
American male bass guitarists
American music industry executives
The Vandals members
Loyola Law School alumni
University of California, Los Angeles alumni
American people of Irish descent
American musicians of Mexican descent
California lawyers
American punk rock drummers
American male drummers
American male guitarists
20th-century American drummers
Hispanic and Latino American musicians